The 2019–20 season was Burnley's 138th competitive season, their fourth consecutive in the Premier League and their 57th in top flight English football. Along with the Premier League, the club also competed in the FA Cup and the EFL Cup.

The season covered the period from 1 July 2019 to 26 July 2020.

Pre-season

Competitions

Premier League

League table

Results summary

Results by matchday

Matches

FA Cup

EFL Cup

The second round draw was made on 13 August 2019 following the conclusion of all but one first round matches.

Transfers

Transfers in

Loans in

Loans out

Transfers out

Appearances and goals
Source:
Numbers in parentheses denote appearances as substitute.
Players with names struck through and marked  left the club during the playing season.
Players with names in italics and marked * were on loan from another club for the whole of their season with Burnley.
Players listed with no appearances have been in the matchday squad but only as unused substitutes.
Key to positions: GK – Goalkeeper; DF – Defender; MF – Midfielder; FW – Forward

References

Burnley F.C. seasons
Burnley